Machitis Terpsithea F.C. is a Greek football club, based in Terpsithea, Larissa.

The club was founded in 1971. They will play in Football League 2 for the season 2013-14.

Honors 
Larissa FCA Championship:
Winners (1): 2012-13

Larissa Super Cup
 Winners (1): 2013

Reference section

Football clubs in Thessaly
Sport in Larissa
Association football clubs established in 1971
1971 establishments in Greece